Below are the squads for the Football at the 2005 Mediterranean Games, hosted in Almería, Spain, and took place between 23 June and 3 July 2005. Teams were national U-23 sides (although in fact none of the players named were older than 21).

Group A

Italy
Head coach:  Pietro Ghedin

Libya
Head coach:  Ante Čačić

Morocco
Head coach:  Aziz El Khiyati

Group B

Malta
Head coach:  Silvio Vella

Spain
Head coach:  Juan Santisteban

Turkey
Head coach:  Turan Mesci

Group C

Algeria
Head coach:  Meziane Ighil

Greece
Head coach:  Stylianos Aposporis

Tunisia
Head coach:  Khemais Abidi

References

Squads
Mediterranean Games football squads